Foyers (meaning "shelving slope") is a village in the Highland council area of Scotland, lying on the east shore of Loch Ness.

Since the late 19th century, water courses near Foyers have been harnessed to provide hydroelectricity. British Aluminium Company built their first hydro-powered aluminium smelter at Foyers in 1896 - the first in the UK - and it operated until 1967, powered by water captured in Loch Mhòr. The power station element of the plant was then purchased by Scotland's Hydro Board and redeveloped as a pumped storage facility using a 5MW turbine. Subsequently, a new power station, with additional capacity of 300MW, was added, becoming fully operational in 1975.

Foyers is the location of Boleskine House, two miles east of the main town, which was the home of author and occultist Aleister Crowley. The house was once owned by guitarist and Crowley collector Jimmy Page.

Foyers was historically a strong Gaelic-speaking area, with 84.1% reporting as Gaelic-speaking in the 1881 census. However, only 4.9% of residents reported as Gaelic-speaking in the 2011 census.

References

Populated places in Inverness committee area
2Foyers